Adelaide Casely-Hayford, MBE (née Smith; 2 June 1868 – 24 January 1960), was a Sierra Leone Creole advocate, an activist of cultural nationalism, a teacher and fiction writer and a feminist. Committed to public service, she worked to improve the conditions of black men and women. As a pioneer of women's education in Sierra Leone, she played a key role in popularizing Pan-Africanist and feminist politics in the early 1900s. She set up a Girls' Vocational and Training School in Freetown in 1923 to instil cultural and racial pride for Sierra Leoneans under colonial rule. In pursuit of Sierra Leone national identity and cultural heritage, she created a sensation by wearing traditional African attire in 1925 to attend a reception in honour of the Prince of Wales.

Early life and education
Adelaide Smith was born on 2 June 1868 to an elite family in Freetown, British Sierra Leone, to a mixed-race father (William Smith Jr, of English and royal Fante parentage) from the Gold Coast and a Creole mother, Anne Spilsbury, of English, Jamaican Maroon, and Sierra Leone Liberated African ancestry. Adelaide was the second youngest of her parents' seven children. She and her sisters grew up mostly in England, where her father had retired in 1872 with his family on a pension of 666 pounds sterling. She attended Jersey Ladies' College (now Jersey College for Girls). Like many other Sierra Leonean women born into the elite society, she was deeply influenced by Victorian values and ideas of family and gender roles.

Casely-Hayford also travelled, and while doing so became interested in Pan Africanist politics. In 1872, she migrated to London and studied at the Ladies College on the island of Jersey. At the age of 17, Smith went to Stuttgart, Germany, to study music at the Stuttgart Conservatory. She returned to England, where she and a sister opened a boarding home for African bachelors living in the country as students or workers. During a speech in 1905, she emphasized the importance African women could have in social and political development. Two years later, she returned to the Gold Coast (now Ghana).

Marriage and family
While in England, Adelaide Smith married J. E. Casely Hayford (also known as Ekra-Agiman). Their marriage may have given her a deeper insight into African culture and influenced her transformation into a cultural nationalist. Their daughter Gladys Casely-Hayford became a well-known Creole poet. In 1914, Adelaide and J.E.'s marriage failed. After that, she returned to Sierra Leone.

Return to Freetown
After 25 years abroad, Adelaide Casely-Hayford and her sisters returned to Sierra Leone. Inspired by the ideas of racial pride and co-operation advanced by Marcus Garvey's Universal Negro Improvement Association (UNIA), she joined the Ladies Division of the Freetown Branch. She became a leading African feminist, using her speeches and writing to challenge male supremacy in Africa and to support African women's rights. In 1915, she delivered a speech on "The rights of women and Christian Marriage" articulating her vision for increasing women's rights. She rose to be President of the UNIA. In June 1920, she resigned from the association because of a conflict of interest between it and her proposed Girls' Vocational School. She toured the United States, giving public lectures to correct American notions about Africa.

Back in Freetown, Casely-Hayford embarked on establishing a vocational institution to help girls learn their cultural background and instill national pride. In October 1923, the Girls' Vocational School opened in the Smith family home with 14 pupils. As principal, Casely-Hayford would have preferred the pupils to wear native dress to school, but their parents rejected this idea. The Girl's Vocational School was very unique because there were not many educational opportunities for girls in Sierra Leone at the time. The school was also unique because it not only taught young girls African history, but it also taught them how to be independent thinkers and economically independent. She wanted to instill girls with the confidence and skills to become future leaders in Africa and Sierra Leone. In a 1922 editorial, she said "Instantly, my eyes were opened to the fact that the education meted out to [African People] had ... taught us to despise ourselves... Our immediate need was an education which would instill to us a love of country, pride of race, an enthusiasm for the black man's capabilities, and a genuine admiration for Africa's wonderful art work," and that she "was looking forward ... to a new day, in which African shall be allowed to expand and develop, along with her own ideas and ideals."

She spent her later years writing her memoirs and short stories. Her short story "Mista Courifer" was featured in Langston Hughes' African Treasury: Articles, Essays, Stories, Poems (1960), a collection of short works by African writers, published in the United States. She died in Freetown on 24 January 1960, aged 91.

Importance in today’s society
Adelaide Smith Casely Hayford paved the way for young girls in her home country to be able to go to school and learn skills that they otherwise might not have been able to learn on their own. Adelaide gave women the right to learn and to speak for themselves but to also persuade mothers to raise their children in their home country so that they could be immersed in the culture that they were born into.

Legacy and honours
Casely-Hayford earned several awards from the colonial government in recognition of her contributions to the people of Sierra Leona.
1935: she was awarded the King's Silver Jubilee Medal.
1949: she received the MBE.
Asteroid 6848 Casely-Hayford, discovered by American astronomers Eleanor Helin and Schelte Bus at Palomar Observatory in 1978, was named in her memory. The official  was published by the Minor Planet Center on 27 August 2019.

References

External links
Langston Hughes,  African Treasury: Articles, Essays, Stories, Poems (1960; reprint Pyramid Press, 1966)

1868 births
1960 deaths
Adelaide
People from Freetown
Sierra Leone women's rights activists
Sierra Leone Creole people
Sierra Leonean people of Caribbean descent
Sierra Leonean women writers
State University of Music and Performing Arts Stuttgart alumni
Sierra Leonean feminists
Sierra Leonean people of British descent
Sierra Leonean people of Jamaican descent
Sierra Leoneans of Jamaican Maroon descent
People of Jamaican Maroon descent
Sierra Leonean people of Ghanaian descent
Sierra Leonean expatriates in Germany
African people of Caribbean descent
People educated at the Jersey College for Girls